Nate James Reinking (born 12 December 1973) is a British-American professional basketball coach and former player, who is an assistant coach for the Cleveland Cavaliers of the National Basketball Association (NBA) and the coach of the Great Britain national team.

Professional career
Having graduated from Kent State University, Reinking came to England and signed with the British Basketball League club Leicester Riders in 1996. He averaged 18.3 points per game and 3.0 rebounds per game in his first season for the Midlands team. In 1998, Nate joined Riders' rivals the Derby Storm, where he posted 17.9 points per game and 2.3 rebounds per game. The following season, he moved further north again to sign with the Sheffield Sharks, where he spent six seasons before moving to the Belgian League and Euphony Bree in 2005, and then onto Dexia Mons-Hainaut in 2007.

Coaching
In October 2013, Reinking was hired by the Canton Charge as an assistant coach for the 2013–14 season. After Jordi Fernandez accepted an assistant coach job with the Nuggets, Reinking was promoted to head coach of the Canton Charge. In July 2019, Reinking was named head coach of the Great Britain national team, to go alongside his position with Canton. In 2021, he became an assistant coach with the Charge's parent team, the Cleveland Cavaliers in the National Basketball Association.

Great Britain national team
Reinking made his debut for the Great Britain men's national team in a FIBA EuroBasket 2007 qualifying match against Slovakia on 2 September 2006. He was a member of every Great Britain squad as a player until his retirement following the 2012 Summer Olympics, and then as an assistant coach from 2013 to 2017. On 26 July 2019, Reinking was named head coach of Great Britain, where he led GB to a 4–0 record during round three of FIBA EuroBasket 2022 pre-qualifiers.

References

External links
EuroCup Profile
EuroBasket Profile

Reinking
1973 births
Living people
American emigrants to England
American expatriate basketball people in Belgium
American expatriate basketball people in the United Kingdom
American men's basketball players
Basketball coaches from Ohio
Basketball players at the 2012 Summer Olympics
Basketball players from Ohio
Belfius Mons-Hainaut players
Bree BBC players
British basketball coaches
British men's basketball players
Canton Charge coaches
Kent State Golden Flashes men's basketball players
Leicester Riders players
Mersey Tigers players
Olympic basketball players of Great Britain
People from Upper Sandusky, Ohio
Point guards
Sheffield Sharks players